Moustafa Mounib Abdel Kader (born 1939) is an Egyptian sprinter. He competed in the men's 100 metres at the 1960 Summer Olympics.

References

External links
 

1939 births
Living people
Athletes (track and field) at the 1960 Summer Olympics
Egyptian male sprinters
Olympic athletes of Egypt
Sportspeople from Cairo